The 1939 Kentucky Wildcats football team was an American football team that represented the University of Kentucky as a member of the Southeastern Conference (SEC) during the 1939 college football season. In their second season under head coach Albert D. Kirwan, the Wildcats compiled an overall record of 6–2–1 with a mark of 2–2–1 against conference opponents, finished sixth in the SEC, and outscored opponents by a total of 161 to 64. The team played its home games at McLean Stadium in Lexington, Kentucky.

Schedule

References

Kentucky
Kentucky Wildcats football seasons
Kentucky Wildcats football